The Canelles River is a river in Saint Lucia. It flows southeast from the central highlands in the south of the island, reaching the Atlantic Ocean to the south of the town of Micoud.

See also
List of rivers of Saint Lucia

References

Rivers of Saint Lucia